Metlhayotlhe Beleme (born 1962, Molepolole) is an Anglican bishop in Botswana.

Beleme trained as an electrician and worked at the Jwaneng diamond mine until 1989. He studied for the priesthood at Lelapa la Jesu Seminary; and at the National University of Lesotho. He was ordained in 1993. He has been Rector of Francistown; Archdeacon of North Botswana; Sub-Dean of Holy Cross Cathedral, Botswana; Rector Tlokweng; Dean of the Cathedral of the Resurrection, Ikageng-Potchefstroom; Rector of Klerksdorp; and, from 2013, Bishop of Botswana.

References

Anglican bishops of Botswana
21st-century Anglican bishops in Africa
Living people
1962 births
National University of Lesotho alumni
Anglican archdeacons in Africa
Anglican deans in Africa